Abraxas, Guardian of the Universe is a 1991 science fiction film written and directed by Damian Lee and starring Jesse Ventura and Sven-Ole Thorsen, with a cameo by Jim Belushi.

Plot
Abraxas and Secundus, are Finders, intergalactic police officers from the planet Sargacia. Their race is physically similar to humans but with an expanded lifespan; Abraxas has been a Finder for almost 10,000 years. Each Finder is equipped with an Answer Box, which serves as a communicator and scanner. It can also detect any object from a distance based on the object's vibration. When testing for the Anti-Life Equation, the subject being scanned will disintegrate if they do not contain the equation.

Secundus wants to access a negative universe which he believes will give him omnipotent powers and make him immortal. To do this, he needs the solution to the Anti-Life Equation. He travels to Earth and impregnates the first human female he finds, Sonia Murray, simply by holding his hand over her belly. The resulting baby will be the Culmator, a dangerously powerful prodigy able to solve the equation. Only a few minutes later, Sonia gives birth to a boy and names him Tommy. Meanwhile, Abraxas corners Secundus so other Finders can lock onto their location and transport Secundus to the prison planet Tyrannus 7. Abraxas is ordered to kill Sonia before she can give birth, but cannot bring himself to do it, leaving her with Tommy. Sonia's parents kick her out of their house, more concerned with the fact that she does not know who the baby's father is than the fact that the baby was conceived and born on the same day.

Five years later, Tommy does not speak but does have strange abilities; when he is picked on at school, he makes the bully wet his pants. The school principal calls Sonia in about this problem, but she refuses to admit that Tommy has problems. Secundus escapes from Tyrannus 7 and teleports to Earth. The Finders send Abraxas right after Secundus with the same technology, but their transport paths cross and their weapons are destroyed. Abraxas chases Secundus, but loses him; Secundus uses the fuse box at an automotive shop to recharge his Answer Box. When the owner confronts him, he uses his Answer Box to test the shop-owner about the Anti-Life Equation. The test causes the owner to explode. Secundus then goes on a rampage, stealing cars, killing innocent people and causing chaos. He continues to scan people, looking for the chosen one who knows the Anti-Life Equation.

He is pursued by Abraxas. Meanwhile Secundus escapes and finds Sonia's residence. While Sonia and Tommy are out at a movie, Secundus tries to test the equation on him. But Abraxas arrives before any harm can be done to the boy and they fight once more. However, Abraxas is stabbed in the stomach and Secundus leaves after saying he will let Abraxas live to see everything destroyed. Sonia returns home with Tommy and finds Abraxas there in the living room. She expresses her anger about being impregnated by Secundus to him, but is convinced by Abraxas to drive somewhere safe with him and Tommy. While en route to meet Maxie, a friend of Sonia's, Abraxas disables his Answer Box in disgust when the Finders order him to kill Tommy. At Maxie's, Abraxas and Sonia grow closer due to their shared goal of protecting Tommy, developing romantic feelings for each other.

Meanwhile, Secundus enters the local school and threatens to kill the children one at a time unless someone brings him the Culmator. Upon re-entering the town, Abraxas, Sonia, and Tommy meet up with the police and find Secundus at the school, where he repeats his ultimatum. Abraxas fights Secundus while Tommy flees, but Secundus overpowers Abraxas and chases Tommy down in a stolen car, cornering him in a garage. Pushed to breaking point, Tommy's latent pyrokinetic powers activate, causing much of the garage to catch fire. Abraxas catches up to Secundus and fights him. Secundus warns Abraxas that he cannot kill him because it is against Sargacian law for a Finder to kill another being who is or ever was a Finder, but Abraxas ignores him and uses his Answer Box to scan Secundus himself for the Anti-Life Equation, disintegrating him and putting an end to his rampage. Although Finder Command are willing for Abraxas to return to Sargacia for his next assignment, he decides to stay behind on Earth with Sonia and Tommy in case anyone attempts to exploit the Culmator again.

Cast

Release
Abraxas, Guardian of the Universe was released theatrically in Toronto on 1 March 1991.

References

Sources

External links 
 
 

1991 films
1990s science fiction action films
1990s pregnancy films
Canadian science fiction action films
English-language Canadian films
Films directed by Damian Lee
Films about extraterrestrial life
Films produced by Damian Lee
Films about police officers
Films with screenplays by Damian Lee
1990s Canadian films